Behagen is a surname. Notable people with the surname include:

 Gysbert Behagen (1725–1783), German-Danish merchant
 Michael Behagen (born 1952), Israeli film director, writer, and musician
 Ron Behagen (born 1951), American basketball player